Wild Things is the third studio album by New Zealand singer Ladyhawke. It was released on 3 June 2016 by Mid Century Records in Europe and Oceania and by Polyvinyl in the United States. It is her first release since 2012's Anxiety.

Background and recording
The album was recorded in Los Angeles with producer Tommy English, who was introduced to Ladyhawke by tattoo artist and friend Kat Von D. "We sat in a room and would jam around, play around with ideas. Or he'll sit there making a beat. I instantly knew when something inspired me. That's when we'd run with it." Ladyhawke explained. Speaking about her first new material since 2012's Anxiety, Ladyhawke stated that the reason why she felt there was such a big gap in her album releases was because she didn't want to release anything she wasn't proud of. Prior to the recording of Wild Things, Ladyhawke had actually recorded more "darker" material, but decided the material truly didn't reflect her real self.

Ladyhawke went through professional struggles before the recording of Wild Things, citing a growing dependency on alcohol and depression. "It was like I had an out-of-body experience. I saw myself and couldn't believe what I'd become", Ladyhawke told The Guardian. "I felt disgusted, like: 'What the fuck am I doing?' I'd made my career come to a grinding halt because I was not doing anything; I was wallowing in my own shit and I was drinking too much, and I felt so bad. I felt the worst hangover coupled with depression and aching and felt horrible. Bloated and disgusting like a pig." Moving to Los Angeles and her marriage to actress Madeleine Sami helped Ladyhawke sober up enough to make changes to her life and the recording of Wild Things took place, with most of the songs written about her new wife.

In popular culture
"Let It Roll" was featured in an advertisement for Australian telecommunications company Optus. The song was also featured in a commercial for Converse entitled "First Day Feels" starring Stranger Things star Millie Bobby Brown. "A Love Song" and "The River" are featured in the soundtrack of the 2016 racing video game Forza Horizon 3. "A Love Song" is also featured in the sitcom Impastor. "Golden Girl" was featured in an episode of the television series Supergirl. "A Love Song" was featured in the end credits of the movie The Breaker Upperers and an episode of the Hulu series Dollface.

Track listing

Personnel
Credits adapted from the liner notes of Wild Things.

 Pip Brown – vocals, art direction
 Tommy English – mixing, production
 Scott Hoffman – co-production 
 Joe LaPorta – mastering
 Sarah Larnach – art direction, layout

Charts

References

2016 albums
Ladyhawke (musician) albums
Polyvinyl Record Co. albums